"Are You Old Enough?" is a song by New Zealand rock band Dragon, released in August 1978 while the band were still based in Australia. It was released as the first single from the group's fifth studio album O Zambezi (1978). The song peaked at number one on the Australian Kent Music Report, becoming the group's first number-one single.

Reception
Reviewed at the time of release, South Australian music magazine Roadrunner said the song was, "Their best yet. This band continues to make superb sounding singles (this will be No 1 for sure) and continue to be the most sexist band in the country. This one, about fucking young women and going to gaol for it is their most offensive yet."

David Nichols described the song as, "essentially a paean to underage sex, perhaps even pedophilia. A glowing, irresistible pop tune, sung delectably by Marc Hunter with uncredited backing vocal from Renée Geyer, it is a virtually flawless pop record, its subversive nature being an essential element of this status."

"When we'd go on the road Paul Hewson would bring a small bag with a few clothes and a chess set. He wrote most of "Are you old enough" on a nylon string guitar out on the water in a dinghy off Magnetic Island with a couple of girls who he wasn't too sure about". (As told to Paul Schluter by Todd Hunter, 2005, Cranbrook)

Track listing 
 Are You Old Enough? (Paul Hewson) - 4:08
 Company (Jenny Brown, Todd Hunter) - 3:54

Charts

Weekly charts

Year-end charts

Personnel 
 Bass guitar, vocals – Todd Hunter
 Drums – Kerry Jacobson
 Keyboards, vocals – Paul Hewson
 Lead guitar, vocals – Robert Taylor
 Lead vocals – Marc Hunter
 Violin [Vitar] – Richard Lee

References 

Dragon (band) songs
1978 singles
1978 songs
Number-one singles in Australia
Portrait Records singles
Song recordings produced by Peter Dawkins (musician)